Pavel Bartos may refer to:

 Pavel Bartoș (born 1975), Romanian actor and television presenter.
 Pavel Bartoš (born 1994), Czech volleyball player